This article summarizes the events, album releases, and album release dates in hip hop music for the year 2018.

Events

January
On January 10, Baton Rouge rapper Kevin Gates was released from prison on parole after serving nine months of a 30-month sentence for gun possession.
On January 19, Chicago rapper Fredo Santana died in Los Angeles from a seizure.

February
On February 10, Ensayne Wayne, a multi-platinum producer from Memphis, was killed in a shooting in Atlanta.

March
On March 2, Rick Ross was hospitalized due to possible pneumonia.
On March 13, Craig Mack died from congestive heart failure.
On March 16, Lloyd Banks announced that he was retiring from rap, but rescinded that statement the following day.
On March 22, Jeezy announced that he will be retiring from rap after releasing his last album named TM 104: Trust the Process.

April
On April 16, Damn. by Kendrick Lamar won the 2018 Pulitzer Prize for Music, making Lamar the first non-jazz or classical artist to win the award.
On April 24, Meek Mill was released from prison.

May
On May 19, Offset was hospitalised following a car accident in Atlanta, Georgia. He was released from the hospital a couple days later.
On May 27, Brockhampton announced that Ameer Vann would no longer be a part of the group following his sexual misconduct allegations. He would be the first member to leave the group since the success of their Saturation trilogy.
On May 29, Trippie Redd and Lil Wop were arrested in Atlanta allegedly over a brawl with rapper FDM Grady.

June
On June 9, Lil Kim filed for bankruptcy, having a total of $4 million in debt.
On June 12, XXL released their eleventh annual freshman list, including Lil Pump, Smokepurpp, BlocBoy JB, Stefflon Don, Wifisfuneral, YBN Nahmir, Trippie Redd, JID and Ski Mask the Slump God.
On June 18, XXXTentacion was shot dead in his car in Deerfield Beach, Florida, the same day that Pittsburgh rapper Jimmy Wopo was shot dead in Pittsburgh, Pennsylvania, and Atlanta rapper Rich the Kid suffered a home invasion where he was robbed and shot at his home in Atlanta, Georgia (Rich the Kid, however, would survive).
On June 21, XXXTentacion's mother announced at a candlelight vigil that the police had arrested Dedrick Williams, one of the men involved in XXXTentacion's death.
On June 22, South African rapper PRO suffered a seizure and died at the age of 37.

July

On July 3, 03 Greedo was sentenced to 20 years in prison.
 On July 16, Azealia Banks cancelled her upcoming album Fantasea II: The Second Wave after an appearance on Wild 'n Out where she accused the cast of "colorist" jokes. She would resume work on the album in August 2018.

August

 On August 18, Kodak Black was released from prison.
On August 24, Geto Boys' founding member DJ Ready Red died at the age of 53, from an apparent heart attack.
On August 31, Eminem released his tenth studio album, Kamikaze without any prior announcement. He dissed the mumble rap industry in the album.

September
On September 5, Ty Dolla $ign and his entourage were arrested in Atlanta, Georgia for possession of marijuana and cocaine.
On September 6, Young Thug was charged with eight felonies related to drug and weapon possession.
On September 7, Mac Miller died of a drug overdose.
On September 13, Lil Xan announced his retirement from rapping due to Mac Miller's death.

October
On October 10, Gilbert Izquierdo, A.K.A. Toker of Brownside, died in a suspected shooting in Mexico.
On October 13, Chris Brown and Drake squashed their longtime beef at the Staples Center during Aubrey and The Three Amigos Tour.
On October 24, South African rapper Hip Hop Pantsula died by suicide aged 38.
On October 26, Florida rappers YNW Juvy and YNW Sakchaser were shot and killed at Fort Lauderdale, Florida.
On October 29, New Orleans rapper Young Greatness was shot and killed at a Waffle House.

November
 On November 18, 6ix9ine was arrested by federal agents in relation to racketeering and firearm charges. 6ix9ine and five others faced trial in September 2019.

December 

 On December 23, Atlanta-based DJ and producer Christian "Speakerfoxxx" Nilan died at 35.

Released albums

January

February

March

April

May

June

July

August

September

October

November

December

Highest-charting singles

Highest first-week consumption

All critically reviewed albums ranked

Metacritic

AnyDecentMusic?

See also
Previous article: 2017 in hip hop music
Next article: 2019 in hip hop music

References

Hip hop music by year
2010s in hip hop music
hip hop